Stillingia acutifolia is a species of flowering plant in the family Euphorbiaceae. It was originally described by George Bentham as Sapium acutifolium in 1842. Its native range includes Mexico, Guatemala, and Honduras.

References

acutifolia
Plants described in 1842
Flora of Mexico
Flora of Guatemala
Flora of Honduras
Taxa named by George Bentham